John Wood (11 April 1865 – 14 February 1928) was an Australian cricketer. He played two first-class matches for New South Wales in 1887/88.

See also
 List of New South Wales representative cricketers

References

External links
 

1865 births
1928 deaths
Australian cricketers
New South Wales cricketers
Cricketers from Newcastle, New South Wales